The 2019–20 Oregon Ducks men's basketball team represented the University of Oregon during the 2019–20 NCAA Division I men's basketball season. The Ducks, led by 10th-year head coach Dana Altman, played their home games at Matthew Knight Arena as members of the Pac–12 Conference. They finished the season 24–7, 13–5 in Pac-12 play to win the regular season Pac-12 championship. They were set to take on rival Oregon State in the quarterfinals of the Pac-12 tournament. However, the Pac-12 Tournament, along with all postseason tournaments, was cancelled amid the COVID-19 pandemic.

Previous season

The Ducks finished the season with a 25–13 record, 10–8 in conference play, and finished tied for fourth in the Pac-12. As the 6 seed in the Pac-12 tournament, Oregon upset No. 3-seeded Utah, No. 2-seeded Arizona State, and No. 1-seeded Washington to win the tournament championship and receive the conference's automatic bid to the NCAA tournament. Oregon entered the NCAA Tournament as a No. 12 seed and upset the No. 5 seed Wisconsin in the first round. Oregon made it to the Sweet Sixteen where they lost to Virginia, who would eventually become National Champions.

Off-season

Departures

Incoming transfers

2019 recruiting class

Roster

 Freshman center N'Faly Dante missed first nine games of the season due to academic ineligibility.

Depth chart

Schedule and results

|-
!colspan=12 style=| Non-conference regular season

|-
!colspan=12 style=|  Pac-12 regular season

|-
!colspan=12 style=| Pac-12 tournament
|- style="background:#bbbbbb"
| style="text-align:center"|March 12, 202012:00 pm, P12N
| style="text-align:center"| (1) No.13
| vs. (8) Oregon StateQuarterfinals/Civil War
| colspan=5 rowspan=1 style="text-align:center"|Cancelled due to the COVID-19 pandemic
| style="text-align:center"|T-Mobile ArenaParadise, NV
|-

Ranking movement

*AP does not release post-NCAA Tournament rankings.^Coaches did not release a Week 2 poll.

References

Oregon Ducks men's basketball seasons
Oregon
Oregon Ducks men's basketball
Oregon Ducks men's basketball